Salvador E. Gómez Agüero (born 11 March 1968 in Santander, Cantabria) is a former water polo player from Spain. He was a member of the national team that won the gold medal at the 1996 Summer Olympics in Atlanta, Georgia.

Four years earlier, when Barcelona hosted the Summer Olympics, he was on the squad that captured the silver medal. Gómez, nicknamed Chava, competed in five Summer Olympics from 1988 to 2004. He is among four Spanish water polo players, all in the 1992 and 1996 medal winning teams, to have competed at five Olympics – the others are Manuel Estiarte, Chiqui Sans and Jesús Rollán.

He made his debut for the national side at the 1987 European Championships in Strasbourg. With the Spanish national team he also won the world title twice, in Perth 1998 and Fukuoka 2001.

See also
 Spain men's Olympic water polo team records and statistics
 List of athletes with the most appearances at Olympic Games
 List of players who have appeared in multiple men's Olympic water polo tournaments
 List of Olympic champions in men's water polo
 List of Olympic medalists in water polo (men)
 List of men's Olympic water polo tournament top goalscorers
 List of world champions in men's water polo
 List of World Aquatics Championships medalists in water polo

References 
 Profile on Athens 2004-website

External links
 

1968 births
Living people
Sportspeople from Santander, Spain
Spanish male water polo players
Water polo centre backs
Water polo players at the 1988 Summer Olympics
Water polo players at the 1992 Summer Olympics
Water polo players at the 1996 Summer Olympics
Water polo players at the 2000 Summer Olympics
Water polo players at the 2004 Summer Olympics
Medalists at the 1992 Summer Olympics
Medalists at the 1996 Summer Olympics
Olympic gold medalists for Spain in water polo
Olympic silver medalists for Spain in water polo
World Aquatics Championships medalists in water polo
20th-century Spanish people